Mogoyto is a rural locality (a selo) in Kurumkansky District, Republic of Buryatia, Russia. The population was 997 as of 2010. There are 14 streets.

Geography 
Mogoyto is located 22 km northeast of Kurumkan (the district's administrative centre) by road. Sakhuli is the nearest rural locality.

References 

Rural localities in Kurumkansky District